Košarkaški klub Profikolor, commonly referred to as KK Profikolor or KK Profi Kolor, was a men's professional basketball club based in Banatsko Novo Selo, near Pančevo, Serbia, FR Yugoslavia.

History
The most successful years were from 1992 to 1994 when the club played in the YUBA League. The club placed 5th in 1992–93 season, and 4th out of 12 teams in the 1993–94 season.

Coaches

  Bratislav Đorđević (1991)
  Boško Đokić (1991–1992)
  Miroslav Kanjevac (1992)
  Janko Lukovski (1992–1994)

Notable players

  Milenko Topić (1991–1995)
  Dragiša Šarić (1992–1993)
  Nikola Bulatović (1993–1994)
  Dejan Radonjić (1993–1994)
  Milan Preković (1992–1994)
  Ivica Mavrenski (1992–1993)

See also 
 KK Dinamo Pančevo
 KK Tamiš

References

Defunct basketball teams in Serbia
Basketball teams in Yugoslavia
Pančevo